E3 is a video game industry event held in Los Angeles.

E3, E.III, E03, E-3 or E3 may also refer to:

Military
 Boeing E-3 Sentry, an AWACS aircraft based on the Boeing 707
 Fokker E.III, a 1915 Dutch fighter aircraft
 HMS E3, an E-class submarine of the British Royal Navy
 Pfalz E.III, a German aircraft
 Siemens-Schuckert E.III, a German aircraft
 E-3 (rank), a paygrade in the United States military

Organizations
 EU three, Germany, France, and Italy, the three nations with the largest populations and economies within the European Union
 Economics for Equity and the Environment Network, a nonprofit organization based in Portland, Oregon, U.S.
 e3 Filing, a Regulatory Filing department within Computershare

Places
 E3, a postcode district in the E postcode area for east London
 E3, archaeological term used for Wauwilermoos pile dwelling settlement (Egolzwil 3)

Science and technology
 E-3 process, an obsolete film developing method for photographic transparency film
 the E3 series (number series) of preferred numbers
 Honda E3, a 1991 Honda E series ASIMO predecessor robot
 Olympus E-3, a digital SLR camera
 E3, a communications channel defined in the E-carrier standard
 E3 binding protein, a metabolic protein
 Estriol (E3), an estrogen sex hormone
 E3 Ubiquitin ligase, a protein component of proteasome-mediated protein degradation
 Dihydrolipoamide dehydrogenase, the third element of the pyruvate dehydrogenase complex
 C/2022 E3 (ZTF), a long-period comet from the Oort cloud that was discovered by the Zwicky Transient Facility on 2 March 2022

Transportation
 E03 expressway (Sri Lanka), Colombo–Katunayake Expressway in Sri Lanka
 Second Link Expressway, route E3 in Johor, Malaysia
 Manila–Cavite Expressway, route E3 in Philippines.
 Kyushu Expressway, route E3 in Japan.
 E3 Series Shinkansen, a Japanese high-speed train
 EMC E3, a diesel locomotive
 European route E03, a European route
 LB&SCR E3 class, an 1894 British class of steam locomotives
 London Buses route E3, a bus route in London
 Mazda E engine#E3, an evolution of Mazda's xC design
 BMW E3, a German automobile
 IATA code for New Gen Airways
 E3 European long distance path

Other uses
 Haplogroup E3 (Y-DNA), a human Y-chromosome DNA haplogroup
 E-3 visa, a non-migrant visa allowing Australian citizens to live and work in the United States
 1. e3 is White's first move in the Van 't Kruijs Opening in chess.
 An abbreviation for Every Extend Extra, a video game
 E3 Harelbeke is a road cycling race in Flanders, Belgium

See also
 EEE (disambiguation)
 3E (disambiguation)
 Triple E (disambiguation)